Jennifer Chapman, Baroness Chapman of Darlington (born 25 September 1973) is a British politician and life peer attending shadow cabinet as a Shadow Minister of State at the Cabinet Office since 2021. A member of the Labour Party, she served as Member of Parliament (MP) for Darlington from 2010 to 2019.

Born in Surrey and raised in Darlington, Chapman served as a Shadow Justice Minister from 2011 to 2016, a Shadow Education Minister in 2016 and a Shadow Brexit Minister from 2016 to 2019. She lost her seat in the House of Commons to the Conservative candidate at the 2019 general election. She chaired Keir Starmer's campaign in the 2020 Labour Party leadership election, and was appointed his political secretary and awarded a life peerage following his election. In 2021, Chapman moved to the opposition front bench in a new position established to shadow Lord Frost.

Early life and career
Chapman was born in September 1973 in Surrey but moved to Darlington at a young age, where she attended Hummersknott School and Queen Elizabeth Sixth Form College. before completing a BSc in psychology at Brunel University in 1996, and later took an MA in archaeology at Durham University in 2004. She had work placements attached to prison psychology departments whilst studying for her undergraduate degree.

Chapman worked as constituency office manager for Darlington Labour MP Alan Milburn. After a career break to have children, she returned to politics at Darlington Borough Council when she was elected as borough councillor for the Cockerton West ward in 2007.

Parliamentary career
In November 2009, Chapman was shortlisted as one of four candidates to succeed Milburn as Labour's parliamentary candidate for Darlington on an open shortlist, i.e. not an all-women shortlist. She was selected to stand for parliament by the local constituency party the following month. Chapman said: "This shows that the people of Darlington want to choose a Darlington person who will put the town first." She was elected Darlington MP in the 2010 general election with a majority of 3,388. As a result of her election victory, she decided to stand down as a councillor.

Chapman made her maiden speech in Parliament on 7 June 2010, during which she asked for social network services to be regulated to stop paedophiles. She also backed the Building Schools for the Future programme. During her time as an MP, she served as a vice-chair of Progress and campaigned to remain in the European Union in the 2016 EU membership referendum.

In 2011, Chapman was appointed as Shadow Minister for Prisons. She had previously written policy recommendations on the subject of incarceration, including a recommendation that prison officers should receive training to help them rehabilitate inmates. She became Shadow Minister for Childcare and Early Years in January 2016, but resigned in June of the same year among dozens of Labour frontbench colleagues. She supported Owen Smith in the failed attempt to replace Jeremy Corbyn in the subsequent leadership election. She later rejoined the Opposition frontbench as Shadow Minister for Exiting the European Union.

Chapman was one of the many Labour MPs to be defeated at the 2019 general election, losing her seat to Conservative Peter Gibson following 27 years of Labour holding the constituency. After losing her seat, she became chair of Keir Starmer's successful campaign in the 2020 Labour Party leadership election and later accepted the role of political secretary to Starmer in his role as Leader of the Labour Party.

In August 2020, The Telegraph reported that Chapman was "likely" to be nominated for a peerage by Starmer, and it was announced in December 2020 that she would join the House of Lords as part of the 2020 Political Honours. In February 2021, Chapman was made Baroness Chapman of Darlington, of Darlington in the County of Durham, and made her maiden speech on 22 March 2021. Chapman was removed as Starmer's political director in June 2021, after what The Times referred to as "months of friction" with Labour MPs, and was re-appointed to the frontbench, shadowing Lord Frost at Task Force Europe and the Cabinet Office.

Personal life 
She married fellow Labour MP Nick Smith in July 2014. She has two children from a previous relationship.

References

External links
Official website
Old website (archived)

1973 births
Living people
Labour Party (UK) MPs for English constituencies
UK MPs 2010–2015
UK MPs 2015–2017
UK MPs 2017–2019
Labour Party (UK) life peers
People educated at Hummersknott Academy
People from Darlington
Alumni of Durham University
Female members of the Parliament of the United Kingdom for English constituencies
UK MPs who were granted peerages
21st-century British women politicians
21st-century English women
21st-century English people
Life peeresses created by Elizabeth II
Spouses of British politicians